Luis Alberto MacGregor Krieger (1918–1997) was a Mexican architect, son of the architect Luis MacGregor Cevallos. He is also the grandfather of Mexican architect Augusto Rodelo Mac Gregor. 
He was a professor for a period of time at the Universidad Iberoamericana in Mexico City. 
One of his first projects was the design and construction of the small museum for the archeological site of Cuicuilco in southern Mexico City, which still stands and operates today.
His predominant architectural style was Modernist , with many influences from his contemporaries during the mid century movement around the world.
His college thesis was the design for a new Mexican National Museum of Archeology and Natural History which during that time was a very innovative idea and design. Prior to his thesis, all archeological artifacts and study groups in Mexico were located on several warehouses, museums and government facilities scattered across the country without a proper organizational system or building. His thesis revolutionized and triggered the efforts to create such institution in Mexico City. .

Works
 Faculty of Engineering (UNAM)) at the Ciudad Universitaria (UNAM "University City"), Mexico City (collaboration with Francisco J. Serrano and Fernando Pineda), 1953 
 Edificio Centro Olímpico (1967-8, together with Francisco J. Serrano and Fernando Pineda), later headquarters of Aeromexico, razed 2018, Paseo de la Reforma 445, Mexico City. Set to be demolished in 2017.
 General Servando Canales International Airport in Matamoros, Tamaulipas
Cuicuilco Site Museum
Parque Agrícola de la Ciudad de México (plan, 1930), Mexico City
Hospital Central Militar Mexico (1940)
A garden at Chapultepec Castle in which a sculpture, La Madre Patria, commemorating the Niños Héroes, is located (1924; sculptor Ignacio Asúnsolo)
Palenque Camp and Museum
(Book) Huejotzingo: The City and the Franciscan Monastery (1934)
(Book) Actopan (1955)

References

Mexican architects
People from Mexico City
Modernist architects
1918 births
1997 deaths